Lactuca aculeata is a species of wild lettuce native to Anatolia, the Levant, Iraq and Iran. A very prickly plant, it is closely related to Lactuca serriola (prickly lettuce) and Lactuca sativa (cultivated or garden lettuce), and can readily interbreed with them. It is possible that Lactuca aculeata contributed to the gene pool of cultivated lettuce.

References

aculeata
Plants described in 1875